Robert Riley was an American football player and coach. He served as the head football coach at Montana Technological University from 1970 to 1971 and at Peru State College in Peru, Nebraska in 1974. After one year at Peru State, he left college coaching and served as the head coach at Kelly Walsh High School in Casper, Wyoming from 1975 to 1978.

Riley was born in Hudson, New Hampshire and grew up in Gloucester, Massachusetts.  He played college football as an end at Northern State College—now known as Northern State University—in Aberdeen, South Dakota.

Head coaching record

College

References

Year of birth missing
Year of death missing
American football ends
Colorado Mesa Mavericks football coaches
Northern State Wolves football players
Montana Tech Orediggers football coaches
Peru State Bobcats football coaches
Wichita State Shockers football coaches
High school football coaches in Wyoming
Junior college football coaches in the United States
University of Wyoming alumni
Sportspeople from Gloucester, Massachusetts
Sportspeople from Hillsborough County, New Hampshire
People from Hudson, New Hampshire
Players of American football from Massachusetts